At the Heart of Gold: Inside the USA Gymnastics Scandal is a 2019 American documentary film directed by Erin Lee Carr. The film is produced by David Ulich, and Steven Ungerleider. The film is based on the USA Gymnastics sex abuse scandal.

Premise 
The film follows the sex abuse and molestation scandal surrounding USA Gymnastics team doctor Larry Nassar, interviewing gymnasts who used to be under his care and detailing the factors that allowed the situation to persist. It features impact statements given by the victims during Nassar's week-long sentencing hearing.

Release 
The film premiered at the 2019 Tribeca Film Festival, and showed on HBO on May 3, 2019.

Critical response 
The website's critical consensus reads, "At the Heart of Gold is a scathing indictment of institutional abuse that sensitively provides victims with a platform to tell their stories." Metacritic, which uses a weighted average, assigned the film a score of 82 out of 100, based on 5 critics, indicating "Universal acclaim".

Nick Schager, of the Variety wrote, "In Kyle Stephens' heartbreaking statement to the court about the personal and familial ramifications of Nassar's actions, the film exposes the far-reaching consequences of such monstrousness, which no matter the courageous and inspiring resilience of its many survivors, has clearly left profound, lasting scars." Robert Abele of The Los Angeles Times wrote, "Hearing from the girls, whether from the courtroom footage or in testimonials for Carr's camera, is ultimately what makes "At the Heart of Gold," even in its no-nonsense execution, necessary viewing." Sophie Gilbert of The Atlantic wrote, "To see such a vast group of women speaking out is shocking, but also encouraging—together, they represent something undeniably powerful. But you're left wondering what it means that there had to be so many of them for Nassar to finally get justice."

Accolades 
Nominated

 2019, MTV Movie & TV Award for Best Documentary

References

External links 

 

2019 films
Films directed by Erin Lee Carr
American documentary films
HBO documentary films
2010s English-language films
2010s American films